Kee is a 2019 Indian Tamil-language techno-thriller film written and directed by Kalees and produced by Michael Rayappan. The film stars Jiiva, Nikki Galrani and Anaika Soti, with Govind Padmasoorya portraying the villain, and RJ Balaji, Rajendra Prasad, and Suhasini in supporting roles. Featuring music composed by Vishal Chandrasekhar, the film began production during August 2016. Upon release, the film was met with negative responses from critics.

Plot
Siddharth (Jiiva) is a hacker who is blessed with a happy family life, which includes his father Ganeshwara Rao (Rajendra Prasad) and mother Valli (Suhasini). One day when he goes to college; he meets with a girl named Diya (Nikki Galrani). However, an unexpected incident happens in leading him to another hacker named Shivam (Govind Padmasoorya), who knows that Siddharth is the only one who can hack their illegal hacking system. Enraged with this knowledge, Shivam sends men to kill Siddharth, who is saved by his father, who gets caught in the crossfire. Eventually, Siddharth finds the culprit behind the attack on his father whilst also learning the reason for his friend's suicide. As Siddharth looks for Shivam, he gets a statement that his girlfriend has been kidnapped. Eventually, through some clues, Siddharth finds the kidnapper and saves his girlfriend. Shivam is then killed by dry ice bombs. In the end credits scene in New York, a masked person hacks Siddharth's phone and calls him, claiming that Shivam will not die as he is immortal.

Cast 

Jiiva as Siddharth
Govind Padmasoorya as Shivam/Roncracker
Nikki Galrani as Diya
Anaika Soti as Vandana
RJ Balaji as Mark
Rajendra Prasad as Ganeshwara Rao, Siddharth's father
Suhasini as Valli, Siddharth's mother
Meera Krishnan as Diya's mother
Manobala as College Professor
Crane Manohar as Cook
Swathishta Krishnan as Anu
Sindhu Shyam as a victim of Roncracker (cameo appearance)
Athulya Ravi as Diya's friend (cameo appearance)
Gowtham Sundararajan

Production 
The film was announced by the producers, Global Infotainment, during late June 2016, where it was reported that debutant Kalees, an associate of director Selvaraghavan, would work on a romantic script revolving around a geek. Jiiva and Nikki Galrani were revealed to be portraying leading roles, while veteran Telugu actor Rajendra Prasad was selected to play Jiiva's father. The film entered production during mid-August 2016, with Anaika Soti also joining the cast. In early October Malayalam TV host and actor Govind Padmasoorya signed into play the anti hero which marks his debut in Tamil cinema. The first look poster of Kee was released on August 3, 2017.

Soundtrack 
The Kee soundtrack comprises 5 songs composed by Vishal Chandrasekhar:

 "Pattikichu Paathiya" sung by Devan Ekambaram.
 "Kattappa Kattappa" sung by Krishnaprasad.
 "Kaadhoram" sung by Vijay Prakash.
 "Kudutha Paaru Kee" sung by a member of the music team Tupakeys.
 "Raajapaattu" sung by Christopher Stanley and Sri Rascol.

References

External links 
 

2010s Tamil-language films
2019 action thriller films
2019 masala films
Techno-thriller films
Indian action thriller films
2019 films
Films scored by Vishal Chandrasekhar